Amblyseius punctatus is a species of mite in the family Phytoseiidae.

References

punctatus
Articles created by Qbugbot
Animals described in 1967